Shiminbyōin-mae Station is the name of two train stations in Japan:

 Shiminbyōin-mae Station (Nagasaki)
 Shiminbyōin-mae Station (Toyama)